Volenice is a municipality and village in Strakonice District in the South Bohemian Region of the Czech Republic. It has about 600 inhabitants.

Administrative parts
Villages of Ohrazenice, Tažovice, Tažovická Lhota and Vojnice are administrative parts of Volenice. Vojnice forms an exclave of the municipal territory.

References

Villages in Strakonice District